The Church of the Holy Heart of Jesus is the only Roman Catholic church in the city of Podgorica, Montenegro. It was built in 1969, replacing the city centre church which was destroyed during the bombing of Podgorica in World War II. The church is a unique example of brutalist architecture, and is located in the Konik neighborhood.

Construction
The cathedral was built in 1969, three years after the renewal of the city's Catholic parish. It was designed by prof. ing. Zvonimir Vrkljan of the Faculty of Architecture, University of Zagreb, Croatia, and was built to resemble a ship. It was consecrated on June 29, 1969, by Aleksandar Tokić, the then-Archbishop of the Roman Catholic Archdiocese of Bar. The church has a  freestanding bell tower, with concrete spiral staircases. From the dark interior, a  tower sticks up, filtering light to illuminate the main altar. Its facade was never finished.

See also
 Roman Catholicism in Montenegro
 Roman Catholic Archdiocese of Bar

References

Roman Catholic churches in Montenegro
Roman Catholic churches completed in 1969
Christian bell towers
Brutalist architecture
Buildings and structures in Podgorica
Tourist attractions in Podgorica
Towers completed in 1969
20th-century Roman Catholic church buildings